Brayan Stiven Ramírez Chacón (born 20 November 1992) is a Colombian professional racing cyclist, who last rode for UCI Continental team . He rode his first Grand Tour in the 2015 Vuelta a España.

Major results

2009
 1st  Road race, National Junior Road Championships
2010
 1st  Time trial, National Junior Road Championships
2011
 National Under-23 Road Championships
1st  Time trial
3rd Road race
2012
 2nd Road race, National Road Championships
2014
 1st  Time trial, Central American and Caribbean Games
 2nd  Road race, Pan American Under-23 Road Championships
 National Under-23 Road Championships
2nd Road race
3rd Time trial
 3rd  Time trial, South American Games
2015
  Combativity award Stage 15 Vuelta a España
2016
 2nd  Road race, Pan American Road Championships
 2nd Time trial, National Road Championships
2017
 1st  Overall Tour of Ankara
1st Stage 1
 5th Overall Vuelta Ciclista de Chile

Grand Tour general classification results timeline

References

External links

1992 births
Living people
Colombian male cyclists
Sportspeople from Bogotá
Cyclists at the 2010 Summer Youth Olympics
South American Games bronze medalists for Colombia
South American Games medalists in cycling
Competitors at the 2014 South American Games
Youth Olympic gold medalists for Colombia
20th-century Colombian people
21st-century Colombian people
Competitors at the 2014 Central American and Caribbean Games